Gareth Owen is a classical pianist. He is the head of piano at Eton College and a professor of piano at several other musical institutions in England.

Education and career
Born in Dyffryn Ardudwy in North Wales, Owen studied at Chetham's School of Music with Polish musician Alicja Fiderkiewicz, and at Guildhall School of Music and Drama with concert pianist Joan Havill. At the Guildhall School, Owen won the Leszeck Dessnet Chopin Prize for his outstanding performance, and the Premier Prix at his graduation in 2000. He later attended the Verbier Academy in Switzerland.

Owen has performed both as a chamber musician and soloist, most notably at London's Wigmore Hall and the Mozart Hall in Zaragoza. He has since taken up several senior professorships at schools in England, including at Eton College, where he heads the piano department, and also at Charterhouse School in Godalming, St John's School in Leatherhead, and the Guildhall School of Music and Drama in London.

References

Living people
People from Gwynedd
People educated at Chetham's School of Music
Alumni of the Guildhall School of Music and Drama
Welsh musicians
Welsh classical pianists
Academics of the Guildhall School of Music and Drama
Teachers at Eton College
21st-century pianists
Year of birth missing (living people)